Miyoko (written:  is a feminine Japanese given name. Notable people with the name include:

Miyoko Akaza, Japanese actress
Miyoko Asada, Japanese actress
Miyoko Asahina, retired female long-distance runner
Miyoko Asō, Japanese voice actress
, Japanese swimmer
Miyoko Hirose, former volleyball player
, Japanese hurdler
Miyoko Watai, Japanese women's chess champion
Miyoko Schinner, founder and CEO of Miyoko's Creamery
Miyoko Takishita (泷下美代子), survivor and robbery victim of a Singapore Oriental Hotel murder case in 1994

Japanese feminine given names